Psilocybe atlantis is a rare psychedelic mushroom that contains psilocybin and psilocin as main active compounds. It is a close relative of Psilocybe mexicana and has been recorded only from Georgia. It has a pleasant taste and smell.

While naturally rare it is often cultivated for its psychedelic properties.

Description
The cap is 2.5–4 cm in diameter, conic to convex, and smooth to slightly striate, sometimes with a small umbo. The cap surface is pale brown to reddish brown in color, hygrophanous, and bruises blue where damaged.
Its gills are subadnate, thin, and brown.
The stipe is 5 cm by .3 cm. It has an equal structure and is brownish with small brown scales, especially towards the base. The stipe also bruises blue where damaged.
Psilocybe atlantis spores are 9 x 6 x 5.5 μm with a broad germ pore.

Distribution and habitat
Psilocybe atlantis has been found in grassy lawns and vacant lots in Fulton County, Georgia.

The original find was made in Fulton County Georgia, growing in a patch of moss beside a 5 year old home whose lot bordered a wooded area within 50 meters of a tributary of the Chattahoochee river.

Gallery

References

Entheogens
Psychoactive fungi
atlantis
Psychedelic tryptamine carriers
Fungi described in 2003
Fungi of the United States
Taxa named by Gastón Guzmán
Fungi without expected TNC conservation status